The BSWW Mundialito, often simply known as Mundialito, is an annual international beach soccer tournament that takes place between few select countries, which are invited to play at the tournament organized by Beach Soccer Worldwide (BSWW). First played in 1994 at Copacabana beach, Rio de Janeiro, Brazil, the competition was reignited in 1997 in Portugal, where it was held ever since until 2022. Few nations have won the tournament, those being only Brazil, Portugal, United States and Spain.

The first Mundialito competition to consist of club teams took place in March 2011, known as the Mundialito de Clubes.

Venues
The following is a table showing when and where the BSWW Mundialito has been held:

Tournaments

Medal summary

References

External links
Official BSWW Mundialito Website
RSSSF

Beach soccer competitions
 
Recurring sporting events established in 1994